Michael Chang defeated Jay Berger in the final, 4–6, 6–3, 7–6(7–3) to win the men's singles tennis title at the 1990 Canadian Open. With the win, Chang became the youngest Masters champion in history.

Ivan Lendl was the three-time reigning champion, but did not compete that year.

Seeds
A champion seed is indicated in bold text while text in italics indicates the round in which that seed was eliminated. The top eight seeds received a bye into the second round.

  Andre Agassi (quarterfinals)
  Brad Gilbert (second round)
  John McEnroe (quarterfinals)
  Jay Berger (final)
  Pete Sampras (semifinals)
  Tim Mayotte (quarterfinals)
  Michael Chang (champion)
  Petr Korda (second round)
  David Wheaton (third round)
  Jim Grabb (second round)
  Richey Reneberg (third round)
  Kevin Curren (first round)
  Amos Mansdorf (third round)
  Jean-Philippe Fleurian (second round)
  Alexander Volkov (first round)
  Mark Kratzmann (second round)

Draw

Finals

Top half

Section 1

Section 2

Bottom half

Section 3

Section 4

External links
 ATP main draw

Canadian Open - Mens Singles, 1990